Ali Amiri (b. 1857 Diyarbakır - d. 1923 Istanbul) was an Ottoman historian. He worked as a finance official and used his assignments to different towns to transcribe Arabic and Turkish inscriptions that he found. He sought out local histories and old documents, both historical and poetic. Through his endeavours he built a library of rare and unpublished manuscripts. These manuscripts augmented the National Library of Istanbul.

Ali was a member of various historical societies and was the publisher of the Ta'rih ve-Edebiyyat as well as the editor of the Divan Luğat al-Turk of Mahmud Kashgari. Although he was known as an editor he did write historical and literary works. He was a key figure in the classification of the archives of the Sublime Porte in Istanbul, giving his name to one of the catalogues, Ali Emiri tasnifi.

References

1857 births
1923 deaths
People from Diyarbakır
19th-century historians from the Ottoman Empire